Pont-du-Château (literally 'Bridge of the Castle') is a commune in the Puy-de-Dôme department in Auvergne-Rhône-Alpes in central France.

Geography
Located 15 km from Clermont-Ferrand (15 minutes by car), Pont-du-Château lies at the crossroad of motorways connecting Paris to Barcelona and Lyon to Bordeaux. Pont-du-Château joined the Clermont commune on 1 January 2004. Since then, Pont-du-Château has had a large territory of more than 30,000 square meters and 283,000 inhabitants.

Sights
 The castle: Burned in 1580 following an epidemic of plague, the castle was rebuilt in the middle of the 17th century on the initiative of Guillaume de Montboissier Beaufort-Canillac, with financial help from his friend Cardinal Mazarin.
 Museum: place de l'Aire. The museum recalls the life of boatmen and other Castelpontins, through many objects, models and documents. The museum is open every day in July and August.

History

Origins
Three boroughs were born in Carolingian times, although precise dates are uncertain.
In the west, Paulhat: during the Roman peace large Gallo-Roman farms existed in the large marsh known as Limagne, Redon, Picou, Tourette Chazal, but in the Carolingian era the village of Paulhat grew at the foot of the cliffs of Littes and Ruchon
The village of Machal beneath the Puy de Mur volcano, dating from the paleolithic era, disappeared during the Norman invasions. But the Sainte Martine church appeared on the fortified hillock, surrounded by a village whose activities related to the river Allier.
In a period frequently troubled by Viking incursions, a stone keep appeared on the riverside cliffs. Louis Le Gros laid siege to it in 1122 and destroyed it.

Medieval city

Guy de Dampierre seized the town in 1212 on behalf of Philip II of France, which made the city a Crown possession. In the 13th century it became a true citadel the "old castle" enclosed by a single wall. Philippe Auguste made it a garrison city, equipping it with two new walls with towers, doors, ramparts which one guesses in the plan of the old city.

Two churches enriched this inheritance: 
 Ste Martine, a Romanesque building built over several centuries beginning in the 13th century, since restored with its original paintings; 
 Notre Dame de Paulhat, which disappeared from the marsh about 1356 and was rebuilt west of the fortifications in 1384, and again destroyed. In the 16th century, with the Renaissance, it saw a resurgence of Auvergnat Romanesque architecture.

Traditional city

Since the old castle had been destroyed in a fire, Guillaume de Montboissier Beaufort-Canilhac, lieutenant general of the Army of Italy built the current castle in 1654 with financial help from his friend Mazarin, on his return to Auvergne covered with honors by Louis XIV. Facing the Allier valley, the castle is in late  Louis XIII and early Louis XIV architectural style, with its northern frontage crowned by a terrace and its broad southern terrace overlooking French gardens.

18th century

Philippe-Claude de Montboissier Beaufort-Canilhac after 1750 undertook major renovations to the castle: vast stables to the west, sculptures and facings of Volvic stone on the northern frontage of the principal masonry and interior decoration with woodwork and ceiling paintings in the French style, for example.

In the same time period, between 1765 and 1773, Mr. de Régemorte designed a new stone bridge, which built Raimbaux father and wire, a bridge that to this day remains indestructible in spite of the significant floods of the Allier, and which made possible the royal road 89 between Lyon and Bordeaux. For nearly 150 years people had crossed the river on a ferry.

19th century

Pont-du-Château then had five ports: Vortille, Palisses, Bouères, Borde St Aventin and the port of Amont, which was the only port built on the Allier between Brioude and Moulins. The opening of the channel of Briare in 1642, the disappearance of the pélières in 1790, the coal mining of ground of Brewed protected by Colbert, the keen demand of fir trees by the masts of the fleet of Louis XIV, a wine extremely appreciated in the capital, of the hemp of good quality for gréement of the sailing ships, the reputation of papers of Auvergne and even passion of the architects for Volvic stone, and it was more than 3000 fir plantations which each year descended the Allier, an incredible increase of the river navigation, a noisy harbour city of life, populated high marines colors. The advent of the railroad in 1865 quelled inland shipping.

Population

Transportation
 Plane: Ten minutes from the  Clermont-Auvergne airport. Twenty French cities are served daily including six flights daily for Paris, four to Orly and two to Charles de Gaulle. There are also flights to four European cities: Amsterdam, Geneva, Milan and Turin.
 Train: at Clermont-Ferrand eight trains go to Paris daily (and one nightly). Daily connections go to Lyon and Marseille. The SNCF makes it possible to travel from Pont-du-Château to Clermont-Ferrand in eight minutes.
 Bus: Member of Clermont the Community, the commune integrates the Perimeter of the Urban transport, the service road drunk is thus accessible with a transport document T2C. The various tariffs and schedules are accessible on
Pont-du-Château is at the crossroads of the regional parks of Auvergne. A few minutes away by car lies the regional natural reserves of the Volcanos of Auvergne and of Livradois-Drill.

Partner cities
 Sainte-Marie, Quebec, Canada

See also
Communes of the Puy-de-Dôme department

References

External links
 City website

Communes of Puy-de-Dôme